Lianga, officially the Municipality of Lianga (Surigaonon: Lungsod nan Lianga), is a 4th class municipality in the province of Surigao del Sur, Philippines. According to the 2020 census, it has a population of 33,869 people.

Etymology and Legends
About a couple of centuries ago, along the bountiful bay facing the bluish sea of the Pacific Ocean was a place like those in fairy tales. the white beaches were traversed by two rivers, one in the south and the other in the north. A little distance from the shoreline, the landscape started to the rise until it reached its peak at the west which is one of the ranges of the enchanted Mount Diwata.  The place was thickly forested, blanketed with big trees, varieties of wild flowers aerial plants and vines. On the ground, wild animals of different species roam around the area. White colorful birds and other winged creatures flit from tree to tree. Nature's Music like chirping of birds, humming of bees and other wood land insects intermingling with the sound of roaring waves could be heard from the distance. This truly translates the feeling of being born free with nature. the place was breathtaking to behold. Indeed, it was Paradise where nature remained undisturbed.

Then men settled along the cove near river in the south. It was said that these early inhabitants were the Manobos who were ruled by a Chieftain (Datu). Their clothes were made of woven abaca fiber and adorned themselves with multi-colored beads. Land and water resources were abundant, hence they love to hunt in the forest, gather shells along the shores and fish in the rivers. there was peace and harmony among the early inhabitants. They were happy and contended. Later however, as their tribes increased their descendants thought of moving to surrounding areas, so there was rivalry as to who will own choice pieces of land. Whenever disputes overland ownership and quarrel among themselves occurred, it was settled in a duel alongside the river in the North. Whoever won was proclaimed a "Daugan" o "Mananaog" by the Chieftain (Datu). The place became popular, hence 
the river was named Pananag-an.

People going to the other side of the river have to wade across it slowly as the current was swift, it always took them such time to reach the other side of the river and they often say to themselves "Langan Pagtabok" of "Malangan Kita" (It delays to cross or we will be delayed). One day, as the old folks claimed, a foreigner passed by the place. After having crossed the river, he asked the people the name of the place. Thinking that the stranger was asking what they were doing, they answered "Langan pagtabok". The foreigner heard "Langan" and thought it was the name of the place, then people started calling the whole settlement "Langan". Later, with he influence of the Spanish "Li" alphabet, Langan was pronounced "Liangan". As generations passed, the final "N" in Llangan was dropped and the "Ll" sound was changed to "Li", hence says that is how Lianga got its name.

History
Lianga is one of the oldest towns of the province of Surigao del Sur by virtue of Executive Order No. 27 on October 17, 1919. The municipality of Lianga is centrally located in the province of Surigao del Sur. It is situated along the Lianga Bay facing the Pacific Ocean and cradled by its shorelines and the Diwata Mountains. Its latitude is 30 and longitude is within 12635 and is bounded on the North by Municipality of San Agustin, on the South by the Municipality of Barobo, on the West by province of Agusan del Sur and the East lies the Pacific Ocean. It is 90.0 kilometers to the south of Tandag City, the Capital of the Province, 237 kilometers from Davao City, 121 kilometers from Butuan and 16 kilometers from Prosperidad, the Capital Town of Agusan del Sur (via Lianga–Los Arcos Road).

In the history of Caraga Region, Lianga was part of the encomienda way back in 1655 under the command of Sergeant Martin Sanchez dela Cuesta. this encomienda covered Palaso (Cantilan). Tandag as its capital, Tago, Marihatag and Lianga. From 1904 to 1936, the Head of the Town was called President, per record obtained, the first elected President of Lianga was Cornelio Layno, whose two-year term covered the period from 1904 to 1906. The first elected Mayor was Otilio Navarro who served from 1937 to 1940. From then on, there were seven (7) elected Mayors of Lianga from 1941 up to the present. Within these periods, two became Mayors by succession, another two by appointment.

Almost half a century ago, the territorial land area of Lianga was vast, considering the fact that the present municipalities of San Agustin, Marihatag and Barobo were once a part of Lianga. The births of these three municipalities were the results of political subdivisions authored by the political leaders of the undivided Surigao. San Agustin formerly called (Oteiza) was the first daughter municipality of Lianga created under Executive Order No. 445 in 1951, during the Presidency of then Elpidio Quirino. The Governor of Surigao that time was late Vicente L. Pimentel. Four years later, the Municipality of Marihatag was created under Republic Act No. 1261 on June 10, 1955. As the population of Lianga increased, it was not spared from further political subdivision. The Electorate in the southern barrios of Lianga moved for the creation of another municipality, called the Municipality of Barobo as the seat of the Municipal government. The creation of the Municipality of Barobo was made through Executive Order no. 407 and 2786 on October 24, 1960. Of the three municipalities created from the municipality of Lianga, Marihatag has the largest land area. It is sad to note that among these four municipalities formerly referred to as the "BLOM" Area (for Barobo, Lianga, Oteiza, and Marihatag) Lianga, the mother municipality has the smallest land area with only 15,000 hectares.

Significant development in Lianga has been noted since 1960 with the creation of Surigao del Sur as a Province (Republic Act 2786).
It was more evident in the 70's to 80's when the coastal barangay of Diatagon [Jiatagon] became the hub of socio–economic activities with the Lianga Bay Logging Company Incorporated [LBLCI] which was a rich source of income. The town of Lianga, too that time started to gain a breakthrough not only in the infrastructure projects such as roads and government buildings but also in income derived from taxes especially from forest products utilized by the wood processing plant of LBLCI.   Barangay Saint Christine has become the minor urban center and Lianga was classified as the influence center of the satellite municipalities of San Agustin, Marihatag, and Barobo.

Lianga is relatively urbanized area where 13,830 or 55.30% of the total population live in three urban centers of Barangays Poblacion, Saint Christine, and Diatagon [Jiatagon] and 11,175 or 44.70% lives in the remaining rural barangay with a municipal population density equivalent to 98.70% person/km2. 
The economic situation in the municipality poses great challenges to its leader and people. Its economy remains predominantly agricultural. It is gifted by its geographic location but is not adequately blessed by nature with substantial endowment necessary to propel itself into a developing economy. The major crop is Coconut, covering an area of 4,236 hectares. Rice ranks second with an area of 1,890 hectares. Other crops are Corn, Banana, and Abaca. The Poblacion and Barangay Diatagon [Jiatagon] are the trading centers with most of the commodities coming from Davao, Butuan, and Surigao. The poor road condition limits the economic activities in the area.

Geography

Barangays

Lianga is politically subdivided into 13 barangays.
 Anibongan
 Ban-as
 Banahao
 Baucawe
 Diatagon [Jiatagon] (also has a large public market)
 Ganayon
 Liatimco
 Manyayay [which also contains Exemeria]
 Payasan
 Poblacion
 Saint Christine
 San Isidro
 San Pedro

Climate

Lianga has a tropical rainforest climate (Af) with heavy to very heavy rainfall year-round.

Demographics

Economy

Culture

Festival
Inatu Festival – "Inatu" is from the kamayo language means "our very own". Celebrated every January.

Education
North Eastern Mindanao State University - Lianga Campus
Lianga National Comprehensive High School
St. Christine National High School (Fishery)
Anibongan National High School
Davisol National High School
Diatagon Catholic High School (Private) and 19 Elementary Schools including Our Lady of Pompei School (Private)

Lumad schools
There are several Lumad community schools built by Lumads tribes themselves.

Alternative Learning Center for Agricultural and Livelihood Development (ALCADEV) Inc. 
Tribal Filipino Program of Surigao del Sur (TRIFPSS) Inc.

These Lumad schools have been in the vanguard in fighting for the ancestral lands and the rights of the Lumad.

The Department of Education (Deped) recognized the Lumad community schools and the ALCADEV system through the Indigenous framework of education now observed by alternative tribal schools nationwide. The policy framework was signed in 2012 by then-Secretary Armin Luistro.

2015 Lianga Massacre

On September 1, 2015, executive director of ALCADEV was killed right inside the school premises while two other Lumad leaders, Dionel Campos, and Datu Bello Sinzo were killed in front of the community by the paramilitary group Magahat-Bagani.

National Literacy Awards

These Lumad schools in Lianga have been awarded the Most Outstanding Literacy Program of Caraga region and in the Philippines for several years. This award is given by the Department of Education - Literacy Coordinating Council.

Controversy

There are allegations that both schools are not recognized by the Department of Education thus their curriculum are not accredited. In effect, students who would like to transfer to other DepEd recognized school is a big challenge continuing the year level of the student. If student would like to move to high school or college is not possible.

Tourism
Bao-bao Falls- Barangay Diatagon
Puro or Lianga Lighthouse- Barangay Poblacion
Tagago Beach- Barangay Poblacion
Kansilad Beach- Barangay Ganayon
Lawis Beach- Barangay Banahao
Causeway Beach- Barangay St. Christine
Mahogany Road- Barangay Diatagon
Little Nest or Tagaytay- Barangay San Pedro
Pocto Cave- Barangay Manyayay
Pamutuanan Cave- Barangay Liatimco
Gran Ola Eco Surf Camp- Barangay Banahao (Lawis)
Baugo Seaside Resort- Barangay Baucawe
Busay Falls- Barangay Payasan
Ancestral Houses- Barangay Poblacion
Baywalk- Barangay Poblacion
Big Times Beach Resort- Barangay Poblacion
Davisol Mountain Trekking- Barangay Manyayay

References

External links

 Lianga Profile at PhilAtlas.com
 Lianga Profile at the DTI Cities and Municipalities Competitive Index
 [ Philippine Standard Geographic Code]
 Philippine Census Information
 Local Governance Performance Management System

Municipalities of Surigao del Sur